The Wilson Creek Bridge (also known as the Smart Road Bridge) is the second tallest bridge in Virginia at  tall, the tallest being the US-460 Corridor Q bridge over Grassy Creek and Virginia State Route 610 between Pike County and Buchanan County at  tall.

The Wilson Creek Bridge is located in Montgomery County and was built as part of the Virginia Smart Road project.

Construction 
Construction began in August 1998. 
The bridge was designed by Florida-based Figg Engineering Group and built by PCL Civil Constructors Inc., a subsidiary of PCL Constructors Inc. at a cost of US$17.4 million. The bridge design is the same genre as the Natchez Trace Parkway Bridge. The bridge is composed of four double-tapered piers with stone inlay, two conventional abutments, and 100 cast-in-place segments. After review of the bridge design by the construction firm, the segments were changed from 4.5 m to 5 m segments, deleting 35 segments from the critical path of construction. The bridge was completed on May 30, 2001.

Awards 
In 2002, the bridge received an honorable mention in the Federal Highway Administration's Excellence in Highway Design Awards, Category 3A: Major Highway Structures Over $10 Million. The bridge also received an award that year from the Concrete Reinforced Steel Institute, the only 2002 award-winner east of the Mississippi River.

Unique Features 
The cast-in-place cantilever box girder bridge design is the only one of its kind in Virginia.

The bridge is hollow. Power and communication lines are carried in the hollow concrete box and run the length of the bridge. Manholes in the bridge deck allow researchers to enter the box to monitor testing equipment.

The support structure of the bridge is inlaid with Hokie Stone to blend in with the environment and meld with the architectural stylings of Virginia Tech.

Bridge Pictures 
Early construction
During construction
During construction
Below main spans during construction
Construction nearing completion
Looking south
Aerial looking southeast
Looking east across Ellett Valley and Wilson Creek
Looking northeast
Looking northwest

References 

Brian Fortner, "High-Tech Highway", Civil Engineering, October, 1999
Gunnar Lucko, "Means and Methods Analysis of a Cast-In-Place Balanced Cantilever Segmental Bridge: The Wilson Creek Bridge Case Study", Master's Thesis: Virginia Tech Department of Civil Engineering, November 30, 1999, accessed April 1, 2007
"'Smart' Road Getting New Name: Willis", Roanoke Times, May 12, 2001
Keith Harrison, "Wilson Creek Bridge Complete; Research Just Beginning", Marshall Concrete Products The Star, Fall/Winter 2001, Volume 2, Issue 2, accessed December 29, 2008
American Segmental Bridge Institute (ASBI), "Smart Road Bridge, Near Blacksburg, VA, Receives CRSI Award", May 17, 2002, accessed April 1, 2007
"Smart Road Bridge Wins Kudos", Roanoke Times, May 17, 2002
"FHWA Gives Awards to Top Highway Designs", Federal Highway Administration, October 13, 2002
"Design and Construction of Smart Road Over Wilson Creek: Montgomery County, Virginia", Transportation Research Board of the National Academies, 2002, accessed May 16, 2007
Gunnar Lucko and Jesús M. de la Garza,  "Constructability Considerations for Balanced Cantilever Construction", Practice Periodical on Structural Design and Construction, Volume 8, Issue 1, pp. 47–56, February, 2003, accessed July 20, 2007
Virginia Department of Transportation (VDOT), "2003 success stories", accessed April 1, 2007
American Association of State Highway and Transportation Officials - Subcommittee on Bridges and Structures, "Our Nation's Bridges: Virginia", June 2, 2005, accessed April 1, 2007
VDOT - The Smart Road Bridge Over Wilson Creek, October 29, 2006, accessed April 1, 2007
Greg Esposito, "Smart Road does bring benefits to valley", Roanoke Times, April 1, 2007
Figg Engineering Group, accessed August 13, 2008
PCL - construction details, accessed August 13, 2008
AVAR - construction details on post-tensioning and form-travelers, accessed August 13, 2008
Marshall Concrete Products - construction details on concrete for piers, superstructure, and bridge decks, accessed December 29, 2008
NXL - inspection and engineering services, accessed August 13, 2008

See also 
List of bridges in the United States by height

Bridges completed in 2001
Buildings and structures in Montgomery County, Virginia
Transportation in Montgomery County, Virginia
Road bridges in Virginia
Concrete bridges in the United States
Box girder bridges in the United States
Cantilever bridges in the United States